Boris Grigoryevich Plotnikov (2 April 1949 – 2 December 2020) was a Soviet and Russian film actor. His film debut was as Sotnikov in The Ascent, the acclaimed final film of Russian director Larisa Shepitko. Plotnikov appeared in more than seventy feature films and television series.

Biography

Early life
Boris Plotnikov was born on 2 April 1949, in the city of Nevyansk, Sverdlovsk Oblast. His father worked as a mechanic and his mother as an engineer-technologist. A few years later, the Plotnikov family moved to Novouralsk.

He graduated from school No. 57 in Novouralsk. He graduated from the Sverdlovsk Theater School (1970, the course of Yuri Zhigulsky) and the Philological Faculty of the Ural State University (1983).

Career
From 1970 to 1978, Plotnikov served in the Sverdlovsk Youth Theater.

He made his debut in 1976 in Larisa Shepitko's internationally renowned film The Ascent, which brought him all-union fame. He played the role of Dr. Bormental in the film Heart of a Dog by Vladimir Bortko.

In 1992, Plotnikov portrayed the prisoner Danilov in the mystery play of composer Alexey Rybnikov Liturgy of Catechumens.

He appeared in the drama television series Empire Under Attack (2000), where he portrayed Grand Duke Sergei Alexandrovich. In the musical melodrama Cricket Behind the Fire, Plotnikov received the leading role of the Cricket, the keeper of the home.

He appeared in the role of Dr. Dmitri Ivanovich in the action movie Shadowboxing (2005) and in the crime drama Experts (2007), where he played a forensic medical worker.

In 2006, director Natalya Bondarchuk invited Plotnikov to play the Chief of the Gendarmes of the Secret Chancellery, Leonti Dubelt, in the drama Pushkin. The Last Duel.

Boris Plotnikov also participated in the military themed series Everyone has his Own War (2011), Snipers: Love under Sight (2012), Fighters, The Last Battle (2015).

Death
He died from COVID-19 during the COVID-19 pandemic in Russia.

Filmography
 The Ascent (Восхождение, 1977) as Sotnikov
 Nakanune premiery (1978) as Andrey Lagunin
 Pugachev (Емельян Пугачев, 1978) as iconographer
 The Wild Hunt King Stach (Дикая охота короля Стаха, 1979) as Andrew Beloretskiy
 Forest (Лес, 1980) as Gennadiy Neschastlivtzev
 Dve glavy iz semeynoy khroniki (1983) as Manfred
 Dublyor nachinaet deystvovat (1984) as Kostin
 Obvineniye (1984) as Butenko
 Iona or Artist at Work (Иона, или Художник за работой, 1984, TV Movie) as Iona
 Sdelka (1985) as Migel
 Peter the Great (Пётр Великий, 1986, TV Mini Series) as Tsarevich Alexei
 Lermontov (Лермонтов, 1986) as Yurii Petrovich Lermontov
 Vremya synovey (1986) as Aleksandr Kordin
 Gobseck (1987) as Verbrest
 First Encounter - Last Encounter (1988) as Kuklin, an inventor
 Cold Summer of 1953 (Холодное лето пятьдесят третьего, 1988) as Nikolai Starobogatov's son
 Heart of a Dog (Собачье сердце, 1988, TV Movie) as Dr. Ivan Arnoldovich Bormental
 Gambrinus (1990) as Misha
 Igra v smert, ili postoronniy (1991)
 Progulka po eshafotu (1992) as Nekto
 Padeniye vverkh (1998)
 Empire under Attack (Империя под ударом, 2000, TV Mini Series) as Sergei Alexandrovich
 Lavina (2001)
 Sverchok za ochagom (2002) as Cricket
 Shadowboxing (Бой с тенью, 2005) as Dr. Dmitri Ivanovich
 Puschkin. Last Duel (Пушкин. Последняя дуэль, 2006) as Leontiy Dubelt

References

External links 
 

1949 births
2020 deaths
Soviet male film actors
Soviet male television actors
Soviet male stage actors
Russian male film actors
Russian male voice actors
Russian male television actors
Russian male stage actors
20th-century Russian male actors
21st-century Russian male actors
People's Artists of Russia
Honored Artists of the Russian Federation
Ural State University alumni
Deaths from the COVID-19 pandemic in Russia